Warrior of Ras: Volume I - Dunzhin is a fantasy role-playing video game developed by Med Systems Software. The game was released on the TRS-80 in 1982, then ported to the Apple II, Atari 8-bit family, and Commodore 64.  A self-booting IBM PC port added digitized speech.

Gameplay
The player explores a new, randomly generated dungeon for each adventure. The player encounters monsters and human enemies, and experience points are awarded based on the disparity between the character's and the monster's statistics. The players' primary goal is the recovery of a treasure hidden on the deepest level which is guarded by a particularly effective team of monsters.

Development

The IBM PC port performs all disk access via IN/OUT instructions to the floppy controller instead of using the BIOS (this was done both to improve performance and as a copy protection). It also was not completely rewritten from the ground up, but instead contained the original Z80 code from the TRS-80 with an interpreter to convert it to x86 assembly language.

Reception
Dunzhin was reviewed in Dragon magazine #71 by John Warren. The reviewer noted that while this game was able to accept more complex commands than other games of its time, the extra typing involved slowed the game down. Describing Warriors of Ras as "yet another Dungeons-and-Dragons style game series", The Commodore 64 Home Companion wrote that Dunzhin "is the first—and easiest—in the series".

References

External links
Dunzhin at Atari Mania

review
Review in The Addison Wesley Book Of Atari Software 1984
Review in SoftSide
Review in Family Computing

1982 video games
Apple II games
Atari 8-bit family games
Commodore 64 games
Role-playing video games
TRS-80 games
Video games developed in the United States